Norka may refer to:

 Nork, Armenia, a town in the Yerevan Province of Armenia
 Non Resident Keralites Affairs (NORKA), a department of Kerala Government to address the grievances of Non-Resident Keralites
 Norka was once a German village located in the Volga region of Russia near the city of Saratov.  The village of Norka existed from Aug 1767 until Aug 1941 in the Canton of Balzer, in the province of Saratov, Russia. Norka was about 40 miles southwest of the city of Saratov on the west bank of the Volga River about 460 miles southeast of Moscow. After all of the Germans, living in the Volga region of Russia, were deported by Stalin in 1941, the name was changed.  It is now called HEKPACOBO (NEKRASOVO).
 The Norka, a fairy tale from Andrew Lang's The Red Fairy Book
 Norka Latamblet (born 1962), Cuban Olympic volleyball player
 Norka Rouskaya, Swiss dancer